Stefan Mitkov (born 16 June 1933) is a Bulgarian cross-country skier. He competed at the 1960 Winter Olympics and the 1964 Winter Olympics.

References

External links
 

1933 births
Living people
Bulgarian male cross-country skiers
Olympic cross-country skiers of Bulgaria
Cross-country skiers at the 1960 Winter Olympics
Cross-country skiers at the 1964 Winter Olympics
Place of birth missing (living people)